Jakob Haartman (8 March 1717 - 6 March 1788) was the Bishop of Turku in Finland from 1776 till his death in 1788.

Biography
Haartman was born on 8 March 1717 in Stockholm, Sweden, the son of Finnish parents Johan Jakobsson Haartman, a priest, and Maria Kristoffersdotter Sundenius. He graduated from the Royal Academy of Turku in 1730 and from Uppsala University in 1733. He earned his master's degree from the Royal Academy of Turku in 1741. In 1742 he became an associate professor of Philosophy and a deputy librarian in 1750, a deputy secretary in 1755 and a professor of Philosophy and History in 1756. He was ordained a priest in 1758.

He was elected Bishop of Turku and Deputy Chancellor of the Royal Academy of Turku on 13 August 1776. He was chosen by Gustav III of Sweden to be the Godfather of Crown Prince Gustav Adolf at his baptism on 10 November 1778. Haartman was married to Eleonora Elisabet de la Myle (1726-1810). He died in Turku on 6 March 1788.

References

External links

Lutheran archbishops and bishops of Turku
1717 births
1788 deaths